Athletics competitions at the 1990 Central American Games were held at the Estadio Tiburcio Carías Andino in Tegucigalpa, Honduras, in January, 1990.

A total of 43 events were contested, 24 by men and 19 by women.

Medal summary

Gold medal winners and their results were published.  A complete list of medal winners can be found on the MásGoles webpage
(click on "JUEGOS CENTROAMERICANOS" in the low right corner).  Gold medalists were also published in other sources.

Men

Women

Notes
*: Original model javelin.

Medal table (unofficial)

References

Athletics at the Central American Games
International athletics competitions hosted by Honduras
Central American Games
1990 in Honduran sport